Mohd Zulkiffli bin Zakaria (born 22 February 1997) is a Malaysian professional footballer who plays as a midfielder for Malaysia Super League club Perak.

References

External links 
 

1997 births
Living people
Malaysian footballers
Association football midfielders
UiTM FC players
Perak F.C. players
Malaysia Super League players